One Away is a 1976 American action film directed by Sidney Hayers and starring Patrick Mower, Bradford Dillman, Roberta Durrant and Elke Sommer. The film is written by Allan Prior and is based on his novel of the same name.

Plot
Two men help their brother escape from a South African jail, sparking a motorcycle manhunt across the local wilderness.

Cast
 Patrick Mower as Tam Bass
 Bradford Dillman as Ruben Bass
 Elke Sommer as Elsa
 Dean Stockwell as Pete Bass
  Roberta Durrant as Olwen
  Ian Yule as Stiffy
  Erica Rogers as Dot Bass
 Gordon Mulholland as Detective, 'Big man'
 Patrick Mynhardt as Chief warder
  Stuart Parker as Warder
  Colin Abraham as Convict
  Errol Ross as First Warder (Quarry)

References

1976 films
1970s action thriller films
American action thriller films
Films directed by Sidney Hayers
Films set in South Africa
Films scored by Ron Grainer
1970s English-language films
1970s American films